Tawqan (Quechua tawqa heap, pile, -n a suffix, Hispanicized spelling Taucán) is a mountain in the Wallanka mountain range in the Andes of Peru which reaches an altitude of approximately . It is located in the Ancash Region, Bolognesi Province, in the districts of Aquia, Huallanca and Huasta, northwest of Chawpi Hanka.

Awasqucha (Laguna Aguascocha Inferior) lies immediately east of it. This is where the Ch'iyar Juqhu River (Aymara for "black swamp", also spelled Chiurucu, Chiúrucu, Chuirucu) originates. Its waters flow to the Marañón River.

References 

Mountains of Peru
Mountains of Ancash Region